The Boca Raton News, owned by the South Florida Media Company, was the local community newspaper of Boca Raton, Florida. The paper began publication December 2, 1955, with a startup circulation of 1200, published by Robert and Lora Britt, and edited by Margert Olsson. Initially a weekly publication, it later began daily operation.

Later self-titled The News, the paper attained a daily circulation of 35,000 throughout Palm Beach County, along with its website bocanews.com.

The paper was formerly owned by Knight Ridder, who sold the paper to Community Newspaper Holdings in 1997. CNHI sold the News to Michael Martin in 1999. Martin sold the paper to Neal R. Heller and Arthur Keiser in 2001. Craig Swill of Coral Springs' Our Town News bought the paper in 2005.

On Friday, August 21, 2009, The Boca Raton News staff was informed by its publisher that it would cease print publication as of Sunday, August 23, 2009. Initially it continued as an online only publication, but was redirecting to a real estate site as of early 2018.

The Boca Raton Historical Society maintains a searchable digital archive of issues of The News from 1970 through 1995.

There are several hyperlocal news sources in Boca Raton to replace this publication including The Boca Post.

References

Further reading

External links

Boca Raton News (Archive)

Mass media in the Miami metropolitan area
Boca Raton, Florida
Defunct newspapers published in Florida
1955 establishments in Florida
2009 disestablishments in Florida
Newspapers established in 1955
Publications disestablished in 2009